Krishna was an Indian actor, film director & producer who worked predominantly in Telugu cinema. He has appeared in over 350 feature films in a career spanning 5 decades. Krishna made his debut in 1965 with Adurthi Subba Rao Thene Manasulu. His third film Gudachari 116 gave him much needed recognition and he went on to appear in successful films such as Mosagallaku Mosagadu, Pandanti Kapuram, Devudu Chesina Manushulu, Alluri Seetarama Raju, Manchi Kutumbam, Ram Robert Rahim, Mundadugu, and Simhasanam among others.

Between 1964 and 1995, Krishna on an average appeared in 10 films per year. He established his production house Padmalaya Studios in 1970. In addition to acting, Krishna has directed 16 films and produced several films.

Filmography

As actor 

 All movies are in Telugu unless specified otherwise

As a director
Simhasanam (1986)  (also producer, writer, editor)
Singhasan (1986; Hindi) (also producer, writer, editor)
Kali Dada (1987)
Sankharavam (1987)
Mugguru Kodukulu (1988)
Kaliyuga Karnudu (1988)
Koduku Diddina Kapuram (1989) (also producer, writer, editor)
Rickshawala (1989)
Anna Thammudu (1990)  (also writer, editor)
Balachandrudu (1990)  (also producer, writer, editor)
Alludu Diddina Kapuram (1991)
Nagastharam (1991)
Indra Bhavanam (1991)  (also producer, writer, editor)
Raktha Tharpanam (1992)
Ishq Hai Tumse (2004; Hindi) (also writer)

As a producer 
Thyagi (1982; Tamil)
Maaveeran (1986; Tamil)

References 

Indian filmographies
Male actor filmographies